General Electric is an American multinational conglomerate.

General Electric may also refer to:

 General Electric Company, a former UK consumer and defence electronics company
 Portland General Electric, a public utility in Oregon, U.S.
 The General Electric, a 1999 album by Shihad